Gref is a German surname of Frisian origin, meaning "Grave". Notable people with the surname include:

Herman Gref (born 1964), Russian politician and businessman
Lynn G. Gref (born 1941), American technologist and systems engineer

German-language surnames